This is a list of Estonian ski jumping champions, as well as silver and bronze medalists, starting from the first championship held in 1933. There are presented also all medalists of the Estonian summer ski jumping championships.

Men

Winter

Summer

Men's Team 
The men's team ski hill jumping appeared from 1980 at irregular intervals, the championship became regular only from year 2003.

Winter

Summer

Ladies

Winter

Summer

References 

 Results of the Estonian ski jumping championships

Lists of ski jumping medalists
Ski jumping champions
Ski jumping champions
Ski jumping in Estonia